Berdura is a genus of ant-loving beetles in the family Staphylinidae. There is at least one described species in Berdura, B. excisula.

References

Further reading

 
 
 
 
 
 
 
 
 
 
 

Pselaphinae